My ReGeneration is the debut album by Joe Elliott's Down 'n' Outz, the band featuring members of Def Leppard, The Quireboys and Raw Glory. The album features covers of songs by artists related to Mott the Hoople, such as Mott, British Lions and Ian Hunter. A ten-track version of the album was available with the 23 June 2010 edition of Classic Rock magazine, prior to the full album's release on 13 July of the same year.

Track listing

Personnel
Musicians
Joe Elliott — lead vocals, backing vocals, rhythm guitar, acoustic guitar, piano, percussion
Paul Guerin — lead and rhythm guitar, backing vocals
Guy Griffin — rhythm guitar, backing vocals
Keith Weir — keyboards, backing vocals
Ronnie Garrity — bass guitar
Phil Martin — drums, backing vocals

Production
Joe Elliott — producer
Ronan McHugh — co-producer, engineering, mixing, editing, mastering
Chris Corney — engineering

Other
Paul Steadman — band photography
Delme Beddow — additional photography
Kristine Elliott — creative consultant

References

2010 debut albums
Mailboat Records albums
Frontiers Records albums
Covers albums